William Heath Bannard (March 6, 1875 – March 22, 1913) was an American football player and coach.  He served as the fifth head football coach at Northwestern University, coaching one season in 1898 and compiling a record of 9–4–1. He is the author of "Football: How to Play the Game", published in 1905. He died of Bright's disease in 1913.

Head coaching record

References

External links
 

1875 births
1913 deaths
19th-century players of American football
American football halfbacks
Northwestern Wildcats football coaches
Princeton Tigers football players
Players of American football from New Jersey
Sportspeople from Plainfield, New Jersey
Deaths from nephritis